Kai Kung Shan is the name of several hills in Hong Kong:
 Kai Kung Shan (Sai Kung District) in Sai Kung District
 Kai Kung Shan, part of the Kai Kung Leng range
 Kai Kung Shan, a hill of southerwestern Lantau Island, directly west of Yi O